Greek musical instruments were grouped under the general term of "all developments from the original construction of a tortoise shell with two branching horns, having also a cross piece to which the stringser from an original three to ten or even more in the later period, like the Byzantine era". Greek musical instruments can be classified into the following categories:

Ancient

Aulos
Barbiton
Chelys
Cithara (or Kithara)
Crotalum
Epigonion
Harp
Kanonaki
Lyre
Pan flute (Syrinx)
Pandura
Phorminx
Rhoptron
Sambuca
Salpinx
Sistrum
Psaltery
Tambourine
Trigonon
Water organ (Hydraulis)

Medieval and modern

String instruments

Byzantine lyra 
Bouzouki
Cretan lyra
Calabrian lira
Guitar
Kanonaki
Mandolin
Mandola
Oudola
Oud
Psaltery
Politiki lyra (Constantinople lyra)
Santouri
Laouto (big and small)
Lavta (Politiko laouto)
One stringed lyra (rare)
Macedonian lyra
Pontian lyra
Violin
Baglamas
Tzouras
Tambouras
Thaboura
Karantouzeni
Bağlama

Aerophones

Askomandoura
Aulos
Floghera
Gaida
Karamuza
Klarino
Lalitsa
Mantura
Souravli (Thiamboli)
Tsampouna
Zurna

Percussion instruments

Cochilia
Crotala
 Daouli
Koudounia
Toubeleki
Trigono
Tympano
Zilia

See also
Music of Greece
Greek dances
Greek folk music

External links
Tα μουσικά όργανα των αρχαίων Eλλήνων/ancient Greek instruments

 
Greek culture